Puavo is a management software and a Debian-based operating system for schools. It consists of Puavo Web and Puavo OS.

Puavo Web 
Puavo Web manages users and the devices. External applications with LDAP support can be connected to the Puavo database.

Puavo OS 
The operating system Puavo OS has an Gnome-Desktop; Firefox and LibreOffice are pre-installed. Older computers are supported. Puavo OS has roots in the Linux Terminal Server Project.

History 
Puavo has been developed by Opinsys for Finnish schools since 2005. Individual schools in Germany and Switzerland also use the software.

See also 
 Edubuntu
 Skolelinux

References

External links 
 Official Website
 Github repository

Linux Terminal Server Project
Debian-based distributions
Educational operating systems
Free educational software
Linux distributions